Alexander Lawrence Henry (born October 18, 1979) is a Canadian former professional ice hockey defenceman who most recently played for the Dutch team HYS The Hague from The Hague. He played 177 games in the NHL with the Edmonton Oilers, Washington Capitals, Minnesota Wild and Montreal Canadiens.

Playing career
Henry was selected in the 3rd round, 67th overall, in the 1998 NHL Entry Draft by the Edmonton Oilers from the London Knights of the Ontario Hockey League. Henry played his first professional season in the 1999–00 season with the Hamilton Bulldogs of the AHL.

Henry made his NHL debut with the Oilers in the 2002–03 season, playing in only three games before he was placed on waivers to be claimed by the Washington Capitals on October 24, 2002. Henry went on to play 38 games with the Capitals.

On October 9, 2003, Henry was again placed on waivers, this time to be claimed by the Minnesota Wild. With Minnesota he played his first full season in the NHL with 71 games played. Henry signed with the German team ESV Kaufbeuren in the 2nd Bundesliga during the 2004–05 NHL lockout before returning to the Wild in the 2005–06 season.

On August 22, 2006, Henry was signed as a free agent by the Nashville Predators. He went on to play two season's with Predators affiliate, the Milwaukee Admirals.

On July 3, 2008, Henry was signed as a free agent by the Montreal Canadiens to a one-year contract, and played his first regular-season game with the Canadiens on February 1, 2009, against the Boston Bruins. It marked his first NHL game since the 2005–06 season.

On May 9, 2012 it was announced that Henry had signed a contract with the Düsseldorfer EG of the Deutsche Eishockey Liga. On October 9, 2013 it was announced that Henry had signed a one-year contract with HYS The Hague in the Dutch Eredivisie.

Career statistics

References

External links

1979 births
Living people
Arizona Coyotes coaches
Canadian ice hockey defencemen
Düsseldorfer EG players
Edmonton Oilers draft picks
Edmonton Oilers players
Hamilton Bulldogs (AHL) players
HYS The Hague players
Ice hockey people from Ontario
ESV Kaufbeuren players
London Knights players
Milwaukee Admirals players
Minnesota Wild players
Montreal Canadiens players
People from Elliot Lake
Portland Pirates players
Washington Capitals players
Canadian expatriate ice hockey players in Germany
Canadian ice hockey coaches